Elephas is one of two surviving genera in the family of elephants, Elephantidae, with one surviving species, the Asian elephant, Elephas maximus.

Several extinct species have been identified as belonging to the genus, extending back to the Pliocene era. While formerly assigned to this genus, Elephas recki, the straight-tusked elephant E. antiquus and the dwarf elephants E. falconeri and E. cypriotes are now placed in the separate genus Palaeoloxodon. The genus is very closely related to the genus Mammuthus.

Taxonomy
The scientific name Elephas was proposed by Carl Linnaeus in 1758 who described the genus and an elephant from Ceylon.
The genus is assigned to the proboscidean family Elephantidae and is made up of one living and seven extinct species:
 Elephas maximus – Asian elephant
 Elephas maximus indicus – Indian elephant
 Elephas maximus maximus – Sri Lankan elephant
 Elephas maximus sumatranus – Sumatran elephant
 Elephas maximus borneensis – Borneo elephant, proposed but not yet recognized as valid
The following Asian elephants were proposed as extinct subspecies, but are now considered synonymous with the Indian elephant:
 Elephas maximus sondaicus Javan elephant †
 Elephas maximus rubridens – Chinese elephant †
 Elephas maximus asurus – Syrian elephant †

The following Elephas species are extinct:
 Elephas beyeri – described from fossil remains found in 1911 in Luzon, the Philippines by von Königswald
 Elephas celebensis – Sulawesi dwarf elephant, described from southern Sulawesi by Hooijer in 1949; also known as Stegoloxodon celebensis
 Elephas ekorensis – described from the Kubi Algi Formation, Turkana, Kenya
 Elephas hysudricus – described from fossil remains found in the Siwalik hills by Falconer and Cautley, 1845
 Elephas hysudrindicus – a fossil elephant of the Pleistocene of Java and different from Elephas maximus sondaicus
 Elephas iolensis (Middle-Late Pleistocene of Africa, descended from Palaeoloxodon recki, also placed as Palaeoloxodon iolensis) 
 Elephas platycephalus

References

 

Elephants
Mammal genera
Mammal genera with one living species
Taxa named by Carl Linnaeus